Arnold Guloy is an American chemist who is Professor of Chemistry at the University of Houston. He is an expert in the area Zintl phases chemistry, crystal growth, materials discovery, and superconductivity.

Education 
Guloy completed his undergraduate studies at the University of the Philippines in 1985. He earned his doctoral degree at the Iowa State University in 1991. His thesis topic was studying the synthesis, structure, and properties of polar intermetallic tetrelides of the rare-earth and alkaline-earth metals. Guloy performed postdoctoral research at the IBM TJ Watson Research Center under the supervision of David Mitzi where he co-discovered conducting tin halides with a layered organic-based perovskite structure. These and similar materials are the basis of perovskite solar cells.

Research and career 
At the University of Houston, Guloy investigates the structural and physical properties of Zintl phases and intermetallic materials with a focus on transport properties and novel materials. He has been a professor of chemistry at the University of Houston since 1993 rising through the ranks to become the John and Rebecca Moores Professor at the University of Houston in 2015. In 1998 he was awarded an National Science Foundation CAREER Award. He was a visiting professor at Sun Yat-Sen University in 2015 and was awarded the Distinguished Visiting Scholar-Lecturer Award from Chungnam National University, Daejun, Korea in 2009.

References 

Year of birth missing (living people)
Living people
University of Houston faculty
21st-century American chemists
Iowa State University alumni
 Solid state chemists
Filipino emigrants to the United States